Podole-Górowa  is a village in the administrative district of Gmina Gródek nad Dunajcem, within Nowy Sącz County, Lesser Poland Voivodeship, in southern Poland.

The village was created by adjoining two villages, Podole and Górowa, in 2009.

References

Villages in Nowy Sącz County